Boot is both a Dutch and English metonymic occupational surname. In Dutch, boot  sounds like and means boat and the name refers to a "boatman". In English the name refers to the maker or seller of boots.

Boot 
 Alexander Boot (born 1948), Russian journalist and author 
 Arnold Boot later Boate (1606–1653), Dutch physician, writer and Hebraist in Ireland
 Charles Boot (1874–1945), English businessman
 Cornelis Hendrik Boudewijn Boot (1813–1892), Dutch politician
 Eddie Boot (1915–1999), English footballer
 Elise Boot (born 1932), Dutch jurist and former politician
 Fred Boot (born 1965), Dutch theatre producer
 Gerard Boot later Boate (1604–1650), Dutch writer and physician in Ireland
 Gladys Boot (1890-1964), British actress
 Harry Boot (1917–1983), English physicist
 Henri Frédéric Boot (1877–1963), Dutch painter and printmaker
 Henry Boot (1851–1931), English businessman, founder of Henry Boot PLC, father of Charles 
 Jaap Boot (1903–1986), Dutch track and field athlete
 Jesse Boot, 1st Baron Trent (1850–1931), English businessman
 Joe Boot (probably an alias), one of the last stagecoach robbers in the US - see Pearl Hart
 John Boot, 2nd Baron Trent (1889–1956), English businessman and philanthropist, son of Jesse Boot
 Leonard Boot (1899–1937), English footballer
 Max Boot (born 1969), American author, lecturer, and military historian
 Micky Boot (born c. 1945), English footballer
 Oliver Boot, English actor
 Pat Boot (1914–1947), New Zealand athlete
 Ton Boot (born 1940), Dutch basketball coach and player
 Vitali Boot, German amateur boxer
 William Henry James Boot (1848–1918), English artist, illustrator and author

Boots 

 Cornelius Boots, American composer and multi-instrumentalist
 Dave Boots (born 1955), American college basketball coach
 George Boots (1874–1928), Welsh international rugby union forward
 Mathieu Boots (born 1975), Dutch retired football player
 Phil Boots, American politician

See also 

 Boots (nickname)
 Boott, a variation of the surname

Dutch-language surnames
English-language surnames
Occupational surnames
English-language occupational surnames